John Patrick Sabatina Jr. is an American politician and judge currently serving on the Philadelphia Court of Common Pleas. From 2006 to 2015, Sabatina served as a Pennsylvania state representative from the 174th district. He resigned from the state house after being elected to serve as Pennsylvania State Senator from the 5th district following the resignation of State Senator Mike Stack after he was elected Lieutenant Governor of Pennsylvania. Sabatina resigned as a state senator in 2021 after being elected to the Philadelphia Court of Common Pleas.

Early life and education
Sabatina was born on October 6, 1970 in Abington Township, Pennsylvania, the son of John and Judith Sabatina. He graduated from Father Judge High School in 1988. In 1994, Sabatina earned a Bachelor of Sciences degree in marketing from West Chester University and later earned a Juris Doctor degree from Widener University Delaware Law School in 1997.

Career
Prior to being elected to the Pennsylvania House of Representatives, Sabatina served as assistant district attorney of Philadelphia.

Pennsylvania House of Representatives
Sabatina was elected to represent the 174th district in the Pennsylvania House of Representatives on March 14, 2006 in a special election. He was sworn in on April 3, 2006 and was later reelected to serve five more consecutive terms. In 2011, Sabatina was appointed to the Pennsylvania Commission on Sentencing on which he served until 2014.

Pennsylvania State Senate
Sabatina resigned from the state House on June 9, 2015 after being elected to fill the 5th state senate district seat vacated by Mike Stack who had been elected Lieutenant Governor of Pennsylvania. During his tenure, Sabatina served as minority chair on Pennsylvania Senate Transportation Committee.  He also served on the Aging and Youth; Communications and Technology; Community, Economic and Recreational Development; and Senate Judiciary Committees. Sabatina resigned from the state senate on December 31, 2021 after being elected to the Philadelphia Court of Common Pleas the previous month.

Philadelphia Court of Common Pleas
Sabatina has been serving as a judge on the Philadelphia Court of Common Pleas since 2022.

References

External links

Living people
Pennsylvania Democrats
Politicians from Philadelphia
21st-century American politicians
1970 births